Erbb2 interacting protein (ERBB2IP), also known as erbin, is a protein which in humans is encoded by the ERBB2IP gene. Discovered in 1997, erbin is a 200kDa protein containing a PDZ domain.

Function 

This gene is a member of the leucine-rich repeat and PDZ domain (LAP) family. The encoded protein contains 17 leucine-rich repeats and one PDZ domain. It binds to the unphosphorylated form of the ERBB2 protein and regulates ERBB2 function and localization. It has also been shown to affect the Ras signaling pathway by disrupting Ras-Raf interaction. Alternate transcriptional splice variants encoding different isoforms have been found for this gene, but only two of them have been characterized to date.

Clinical significance 

Erbin's C-terminal PDZ domain is able to bind to ErbB2, a protein tyrosine kinase which is often associated with poor prognosis in epidermal oncogenesis.   Erbin's N-terminal region has been shown to disrupt Ras to Raf binding and may be, through this action, a tumor suppressing protein.

Interactions 

Erbin has been shown to interact with:
 Dystonin 
 HER2/neu 
 ITGB4
 Mothers against decapentaplegic homolog 3 
 PKP4 and
KSR1

References

Further reading 

 
 
 
 
 
 
 
 
 
 
 
 
 
 
 
 
´

Proteins